The floor is made of lava can refer to:

 The floor is lava, a children's game in which players must avoid touching the ground
 The Floor Is Made of Lava, a Danish rock band
 Floor Is Lava, a 2020 reality television show on Netflix based on the children's game
 Hot Lava (video game), a 2019 adventure video game by Klei Entertainment based on the children's game
 A volcano